Mohamed Timoumi (born 15 January 1960) is a Moroccan former footballer. He was named African Footballer of the Year in 1985, and was the last player to win this award while playing club football in an African country. In 2006, he was selected by CAF as one of the best 200 African football players of the last 50 years.

Career
The player took part in the 1986 FIFA World Cup in Mexico. At club level, Mohammed Timoumi won the CAF Champions League with FAR Rabat, the biggest Moroccan football club of his era. He also competed for Morocco at the 1984 Summer Olympics.

Mohamed Timoumi played at a young age for the team of the Union of Touarga, where he was the youngest player. It was there where he was first noticed by the observers and experts of Moroccan football.

His burgeoning talent led him to join one of the biggest Moroccan clubs: FAR Rabat, with whom he won the CAF Champions League in 1985.

In 1985, his talent exploded despite a fracture during the FAR Rabat match against the Egyptian team Zamalek in the semifinals. During this year, Timoumi was, in the unanimous opinion of the international sports press, the star of Africa. He also received the Ballon d'Or Africain.

A year later, he participated in the final phase of the 1986 World Cup in Mexico. In Mexico City he was considered one of the most important elements of the Moroccan selection. Morocco ranked first in its group with 0 defeats and a resounding victory against Portugal 3–1. This result allowed him to be the first Arab and African country to reach the second round of the World Cup.

Timoumi's entry into the world of professionalism (Spain and Belgium) had a negative effect on his psychology, as according to several observers, Timoumi's professional career was poorly managed, which led to a more or less premature retirement.

Career statistics

International

Scores and results list Morocco's goal tally first, score column indicates score after each Morocco goal.

Honours
As Far
Botola Pro: 1984
CAF Champions League: 1985
Coupe du Trône: 1984, 1985

Morocco
1983 Mediterranean Games Champion: 1983
1980 African Cup of Nations: 3rd place
Pan Arab Games runner-up: 1985
Nehru Cup: 3rd place

individual
African Footballer of the Year: 1985
Best Moroccan player in 1985
Best player of the CAF Champions League: 1985
African Footballer of the 20th century: 30th place

References 

1960 births
Living people
Moroccan footballers
Footballers from Rabat
Moroccan expatriate footballers
Morocco international footballers
Olympic footballers of Morocco
Association football midfielders
Footballers at the 1984 Summer Olympics
1986 FIFA World Cup players
1980 African Cup of Nations players
1988 African Cup of Nations players
Competitors at the 1979 Mediterranean Games
Competitors at the 1983 Mediterranean Games
Mediterranean Games gold medalists for Morocco
Moroccan expatriate sportspeople in Belgium
Moroccan expatriate sportspeople in Oman
Moroccan expatriate sportspeople in Spain
Expatriate footballers in Belgium
Expatriate footballers in Oman
Expatriate footballers in Spain
AS FAR (football) players
K.S.C. Lokeren Oost-Vlaanderen players
Suwaiq Club players
Real Murcia players
Belgian Pro League players
La Liga players
African Footballer of the Year winners
Olympique Club de Khouribga players
Mediterranean Games medalists in football